Berna Yeniçeri (born January 26, 1996) is a Turkish women's football defender, who plays in the Super League for Galatasaray. She has been a member of the Turkish national team since 2011.

Club career 

Yeniçeri made her professional debut on November 9, 2006, for her hometown club, Kdz. Ereğlispor. She helped them gain promotion to the Women's First League at the end of 2010–11 season.

After playing six seasons for Kdz. Ereğlispor, she transferred to the Izmir-based league-champions Konak Belediyespor on July 25, 2014. With her new team, she took part at the 2014–15 UEFA Women's Champions League qualifying round matches.  She played in three matches of the 2015–16 UEFA Women's Champions League qualifying round, and scored one goal.

At the end of the 2015–16 season, Konak Belediyespor won the Turkish Women's Football Super League. Yeniçeri played in three matches of the Group 9 of the 2016–17 UEFA Women's Champions League qualifying round.

By mid-August 2017, she had transferred to the Istanbul-based rival Ataşehir Belediyespor after three seasons with Konak Belediyespor.

In the 2018–19 First League season, she returned to her former club Konak Belediyespor.
By mid April, right before the 2020-21 Turkcell Women's Football League season started, she joined Beşiktaş J.K. in Istanbul, and helped them to win the league in that season.

Galatasaray 
On 9 August 2022, she was transferred to the Galatasaray club.

International career 

Yeniçeri made her first Turkey girls' U-17 national team appearance in the 2013 UEFA Women's Under-17 Championship qualification – Group 10 match against Wales on August 28, 2012. She played also against Norway and Latvia at the same competition. Yeniçeri was capped seven times for the Turkish U-17 national team.

At the 2014 UEFA Women's Under-19 Championship First qualifying round – Group 10 match against Belgium on September 21, 2013, she made her entrance into the Turkey women's U-19 national team.

Her debut in the Turkey women's national team took place in the 2015 FIFA Women's World Cup qualification – UEFA Group 6 match against Wales on June 14, 2014.

Career statistics 
.

Honours 
 Turkish Women's First Football League
 Kdz. Ereğlispor
 Third places (2): 2011–12, 2012–13

 Konak Belediyespor
 Winners (3): 2014–15, 2015–16, 2016–17
 Third places (1): 2018–19

 Ataşehir Belediyespor
 Winners (3): 2017–18

 Beşiktaş J.K.
 Winners (1): 2020-21

References 

 
1996 births
Living people
People from Karadeniz Ereğli
Turkish women's footballers
Women's association football defenders
Turkey women's international footballers
Karadeniz Ereğlispor players
Konak Belediyespor players
Ataşehir Belediyespor players
Beşiktaş J.K. women's football players
Turkish Women's Football Super League players
Galatasaray S.K. women's football players